Camilo Ugo Carabelli was the defending champion but lost in the second round to Giovanni Mpetshi Perricard.

Daniel Altmaier won the title after defeating Tomás Martín Etcheverry 6–1, 6–7(4–7), 6–4 in the final.

Seeds

Draw

Finals

Top half

Bottom half

References

External links
Main draw
Qualifying draw

Lima Challenger II - 1
2022 Singles